Visitación Badana Ribagorda (born 2 July 1937) is a Filipino athlete. She competed in the women's long jump at the 1960 Summer Olympics.

References

1937 births
Living people
Athletes (track and field) at the 1960 Summer Olympics
Filipino female long jumpers
Olympic track and field athletes of the Philippines
Place of birth missing (living people)
Asian Games medalists in athletics (track and field)
Asian Games gold medalists for the Philippines
Medalists at the 1958 Asian Games
Athletes (track and field) at the 1958 Asian Games